Aali Mosque is a mosque located in the Srinagar city of Jammu and Kashmir, India. It was constructed in 1471 A.D. during the reign of Shamiri king Sultan Hassan Shah. The structure is the largest existing mosque within the premises of Eidgah Srinagar. It is also the second largest mosque in the Kashmir Valley after the Jamia Masjid, also located in Srinagar. The building shows a unique synthesis between Central Asian and local traditions of wooden architecture. The mosque is based on a 4m×4m grid supported on 5 m 151 wooden columns of 0.95 m girth. The main hall on the ground floor measuring 61.2 m by 20.5 m consists of 75 such modules. All 151 deodar columns are rested on carved stone pedestals with varying designs. The overall area of the mosque is 1844 m2.

References

Buildings and structures in Srinagar
Mosques in Jammu and Kashmir
Religious buildings and structures completed in 1471